Alžběta Trojanová (born 1987) is a Czech journalist and television presenter. Trojanová is known for cohosting the video game television program  from 2011 to 2019.

Early life 
Trojanová was born in Prague in 1987. When she was young, Trojanová and her brother often played video games together on a Sega Mega Drive that they received when she was six years old. Every week, her father would take her to a games bazaar close to his barracks to sell their old games and buy new ones. When she was older, she enjoyed games like Heroes of Might and Magic and Hexen.

Trojanová began her career writing for the now-defunct Czech version of GameStar magazine in 2004. She studied at Charles University, where she received a degree in marketing communication and public relations in 2011 and a master's degree in media studies.

Career 

Trojanová and  became well-known for cohosting the video game television program , on Prima Cool, from 2011 to 2019.

Trojanová and Tuček next cohosted the  video game shows  in 2019 and then New+ from November 2019 to January 2020, however both were cancelled after cycling through several formats. After the pair's contract with Televize Seznam was terminated later that year, Trojanová moved to Tiscali Media, joining the editorial board and managing video content of its website . That year she also began hosting Geek News, a technology and software news show, for online electronics retailer .

Trojanová has spoken on topics such as sexism and gender representation in video games.

References 

1987 births
Living people
Czech columnists
Czech women columnists
Czech journalists
Czech television presenters
Czech women journalists
Czech women television presenters
Charles University alumni
Journalists from Prague
Magazine writers
Online journalists
Women in the video game industry
Women video game critics
Video game critics